is a Japanese football manager and is current the head coach of J1 League club Cerezo Osaka.

Managerial career
Having first taken over as Cerezo Osaka manager after the departure of Brazilian Levir Culpi, Kogiku renewed his contract ahead of the 2022 season.

Managerial statistics

References

1975 births
Living people
Sportspeople from Kobe
Association football people from Hyōgo Prefecture
Aichi Gakuin University alumni
Japanese footballers
Japanese football managers
J1 League managers
Cerezo Osaka managers
Association footballers not categorized by position